Bathori is a surname. Notable people with the surname include:

 Jane Bathori (1877–1970), French opera singer
 Gabriel Báthori (1589–1613), Transylvanian prince
 Elizabeth Bathori (1560–1614), Hungarian noblewoman

See also
 Bathory (disambiguation)